Meharia acuta is a moth in the family Cossidae. It is found in Saudi Arabia, Oman and Yemen.

References

Moths described in 1982
Meharia
Invertebrates of the Arabian Peninsula